Wouter Pietersz. Crabeth II (1594 – c. 18 June 1644) was a Dutch Golden Age painter.

Biography
Wouter Crabeth was born in Gouda in 1594, the son of the writer and politician Pieter Woutersz. Crabeth. He was named after his grandfather Wouter Crabeth I, who was a celebrated master glassmaker. Crabeth took an apprenticeship under Cornelis Ketel, who was a well known portrait painter in Amsterdam. It is possible that Crabeth was also a student of Abraham Bloemaert in Utrecht.

In 1613, Crabeth made his Grand Tour. Such a tour, ending in Florence and Rome, was considered a necessary rite of passage for completing a Flemish artist's classical education, ever since Karel van Mander's Schilderboeck was published in 1604. He was in Paris in 1615 and in Aix-en-Provence the following year. Then he travelled to Italy, where he studied the local masterpieces and worked at the various painting schools and workshops. In 1619, while in Rome, he became a member of the Bentvueghels, with other painters such as Cornelius van Poelenburgh, Bartholomeus Breenbergh, Wybrand de Geest and Leonard Bramer. They gave him the nickname "De Almanack" (The Almanac). Crabeth is represented in an anonymous drawing (see sidebar in top-right) drawn in 1620 and saved in the Museum Boijmans Van Beuningen in Rotterdam. Crabeth was then known as Wouter van der Gou (i.e. Wouter of Gouda); he was often seen together with other members of the Bentvueghels.

In 1626, he returned to Gouda as a schutter (soldier). In 1628, he married the mayor's daughter, Adriana Gerritsdr Vroesen. The same year, at the time that his own father became mayor, he was named captain of the Schutterij, a function which he continued until his death in 1644. In this role, in 1629, he took part in the Siege of 's-Hertogenbosch.

Before that, he received an order from curate Petrus Purmerent for two altarpieces for the Catholic Church of Saint-Jean-Baptiste (later the Old Catholic Church) and Catharinagasthuis, a religious community. These two paintings are currently held in the :nl:Museum Gouda (:nl:Museum Het Catharina Gasthuis) in Gouda and the Rijksmuseum of Amsterdam. The two works – The Assumption of the Virgin Mary (Ten-Hemelopneming van Maria) and Doubting Thomas (Ongelovige Thomas) – show a strong Italian influence, and are stylistically close to Caravaggio. In 1631 and 1641, Crabeth painted another two altarpieces for the Church of Saint-Jean-Baptiste, which are also at the Museum Gouda.

As well as altarpieces, Crabeth often painted card players and shepherds, which are very close in spirit to the works of Caravaggio. These tableaux were mostly painted after his return to Gouda. Only a small number of these works remain.

Wouter Crabeth was succeeded by his students Jan Ariens Duif, Dirk de Vrije, Jan Govertsz Verbijl, Jan Verzijl and Aert Van Waes. Crabeth was the most important Dutch Golden Age artist in the town of Gouda.

Description by Ignatius Walvis

The historian Walvis, of Gouda, wrote in 1713:
 One of the main disciples of Ketel, Wouter Crabeth, grandson of the illustrator and glass painter Wouter Pietersz Crabet. This Wouter visited France, Italy, and all the painting schools of Rome, after which, a voyage of 13 years, he returned to Gouda where, in 1628, he married Adriana Vroesen. His most important works are the Assumption of the Virgin Mary, on the altar of the priory of I.W. [= Ignatius Walvis]. His last great work of portraiture, the Council of War of Gouda which was then in office, represented by its large size, is hung in the hall of Saint Joris Doelen.—Ignatius Walvis

Partial list of works
 The Adoration of the Magi (Aanbidding der Koningen), 1631 (Museum het Catharina Gasthuis Gouda).
 Amusement of the shepherds (Herdersvermaak) (Koninklijk Museum voor Schone Kunsten, Anvers).
 The Assumption of the Virgin Mary (Ten-Hemelopneming van Maria), 1628 (Museum het Catharina Gasthuis, Gouda).
 The Assumption of the Virgin Mary was conceived in 1628 by Crabeth as an altar, which was commissioned by the priest Petrus Purmerent for schuilkerk. Forgotten for more than three centuries, it was rediscovered in 1970 – in the attic of the rectory – by the then director of the Catharina Gasthuis in Gouda, Dr. Jan Schouten. The work is now exhibited in the new museum.
 The Drinkers (attributed; place of conservation unknown, sold on 11 March 1999 by Marc-Arthur Kohn of Paris).
 Company of musicians. (Szépmüvézeti Muzeum, Budapest).
 The Conversion of Guillaume d’Aquitaine by Bernard de Clairvaux (Bernardus van Clairvaux bekeert Willem van Aquitanië, 1641 (Museum het Catharina Gasthuis Gouda).
 Couple playing the flute (Koninklijk Museum voor Schone Kunsten, Anvers).
 The dying warrior (Stervende krijgsman) (private collection).
 The card players (Muzeum Narodowe, Warsaw).
 The card players (place of conservation unknown, sold at auction 17 January 1992 by Sotheby's in New York).
 Harmanus Herberts and his officials, 1642 (Museum het Catharina Gasthuis Gouda).
 La Mise au tombeau, probably destroyed in 1945 (last seen in the Kaiser-Friedrich-Museum, in Berlin).
 Les Noces de Cana (De Bruiloft te Kana), painted 1640 (Museum het Catharina Gasthuis Gouda).
 Doubting Thomas (Ongelovige Thomas), around 1628 (Rijksmuseum, Amsterdam – loaned to the Museum Gouda).
 Les Tricheurs (Gemäldegalerie, Berlin).

Notes

References

Sources

  J. Schouten, Wie waren zij ? Een reeks van Goudse mannen en vrouwen die men niet mag vergeten, Repro-Holland, Alphen aan den Rijn, 1980.
  Xander Van Eck, Kunst, twist en devotie, Eburon, Delft, 1994 
  De Gilden in Gouda, Museum Het Catharina Gasthuis Gouda - Waanders Zwolle, Gouda, 1996,
  I. Walvis, Beschrijving der stad Gouda door I.W., 2 dln., Gouda, 1713, éd. fac-similée 1972
  Rudie Van Leeuwen, « Portretten op een contrareformatorisch altaarstuk : Wouter Pietersz. Crabeths Ten Hemelopneming van Maria uit 1628 », in Desipientia : Zin & Waan, année 14, nr. 2 (nov. 2007), p. 44-45.
  Benedict Nicolson, Burlington Magazine, Caravaggism in Europe, 1989.

1594 births
1644 deaths
Dutch Golden Age painters
Dutch male painters
People from Gouda, South Holland
Members of the Bentvueghels
Caravaggisti
Catholic painters